The Gammaretrovirus core encapsidation signal is an RNA element known to be essential for stable dimerisation and efficient genome packaging during virus assembly. Dimerisation of the viral RNA genomes is proposed to act as an RNA conformational switch which exposes conserved UCUG elements and enables efficient genome encapsidation. The structure of this element is composed of three stem-loops. Two of the stem-loops called SL-C and SL-D form a single co-axial extend helix.

See also
Bacteriophage pRNA

References

External links
 

Cis-regulatory RNA elements